Charles Udoh is the current Commissioner for Information and Strategy in Akwa Ibom State, Nigeria. On December 1, 2016, he was appointed the Commissioner for Information and Strategy by  

Governor Udom Emmanuel.

Personal life 
Charles Udoh attended Diamond Hill Primary School, Calabar and then West African Peoples' Institute, Calabar before moving to Akwa Ibom State to attend the School of Art and Science and then subsequently, the University of Uyo, where he got his first degree. Udoh got married in 1998. The marriage has produced children. On July 25, 2018, he celebrated his 20th marriage anniversary in Akwa Ibom State.

Career 
Udoh began his career as a trainer and consultant at the Financial Institutions Training Center (FITC), Lagos, Nigeria. In 2003, he got a job at First Bank of Nigeria and was in charge of the company's brand department. In 2006, he was offered a job at Guaranty Trust Bank as the company's group brand manager and head of corporate communications. In 2008, he was recruited by KPMG Professional Services and given the position of group head, corporate communications for Diamond Bank. He is also the founder of Adam & Agnes Limited, a brand, marketing and communication agency. Until his appointment on 1 December 2016, Udoh was the Head of Brand and Marketing Communications at Wema Bank.

Awards and honours 
In 2018, Udoh was honoured with the investiture of an induction as a Honorary Fellow of the Institute of Information Management by the Institute of Information Management, Nigeria. Again, In 2018, he was conferred with the Mental Health Ambassador Award by the organizers of the "Sacrificial Lamb" Arts Exhibition held in 2018 at the National Art Gallery, Uyo for his contributions towards the successful hosting of the event. Africa's Distinguished Personality Award by Trans-Africa Students Initiative, 2018.

References 

Year of birth missing (living people)
Nigerian politicians
University of Uyo alumni
Living people